Pit Kroke (born Rolf Peter Kroke: March 1, 1936 Fürstenwalde / Spree, Germany - November 1, 2016 Berlin Germany) was a German artist and architect.

He studied sculpture under Hans Uhlmann at the Academy of Fine Arts in Berlin. There he also worked on experimental photography and abstract film, as well as working on architectural studies. 1964 he went to Sardinia, where he initially worked as an architect. 1981 he approached the free artistic activity again, which he devoted himself exclusively to since then. Since 1993, he has lived and worked in Berlin and Sardinia. He died 2016 in Berlin..

References 
"Studie 23" 1958 short film, Directors Pit Kroke, Peter Lilienthal, Jörg Müller. https://www.imdb.com/title/tt0997375/?ref_=nm_flmg_dr_1

Geschichtswand - Willy-Brandt-Haus - Berlin - Momentaufnahmen der deutschen Sozialdemokratie - https://www.willy-brandt-haus.de/kunst-kultur/geschichtswand/

SOLO EXHIBITIONS 
1986

 Galleria “Nuova 2000”, Bologna
 5 Large sculptures in the historic Old town of Bologna

1987

 Galleria “Arte Duchamp”, Cagliari
 Erection of the sculpture Bos in Piazza della Costituzione, Bologna

1989

 Galleria “Il Millennio”, Rome
 Museo “Galleria d’arte Moderna, Villa delle Rose”, Bologna

1990

 Sculpture mile Inner city of Munich 
 18 large sculptures in public space
 Wilhelm Lehmbruck Museum, Duisburg

1991

 Installation of the sculpture KEANAA in Essen
 Galleria “Il Millennio”, Rome
 Opening exhibition Goethe-House, New York City
 Temporary installation of the sculpture TIKO Central Park South, New York City
 District Museum, Hanover

1992

 Erection of the sculpture Tiko in front of the Queens Museum, New York C.
 Erection of the sculpture got in Hanover

1993

 Galerie Pabst, Frankfurt/Main
 Galerie Tammen & Busch, Berlin

1994

 Sculpture project “City Signs” in the Old Museum, Berlin
 Saxon Kunstverein, Dresden 
 Town House Münster Platz, Ulm

1995

 Galerie Utermann and GalerieTammen & Busch, 7 large sculptures in the sculpture Park Harenberg City center, Dortmund
 Formation of the sculpture Gran Golar in the sculpture Garden of the Teutloff Collection at Brock University, Toronto

1996

 Municipal Cultural centre EXMÀ, Cagliari
 Temporary installation of the sculpture Lenz in Hackische Höfe, Berlin

1997

 “Turnaround Time” at the Harenberg city center, Dortmund
 Architecture Gallery Aedes East, Berlin
 Galerie Tammen & Busch, Berlin

1998

 Installation of the sculpture Lenz at Olivaer Platz, Berlin

2003

 “Seeing and thinking” 19 in the Academy of Arts, Berlin 

2008

 “Sculptural architecture – architectural sculptures” at the gallery Aedes am Pfeffer Mountain, Berlin

2010

 Establishment of TIKO Gerisch Foundation, Neumünster LINK

2013

 Installation DANOA Sculpture Park Queen Elisabeth Bergen Clinics, Berlin

2016

 Exhibition Comune San Teodoro, Italy
 Exhibition and installation Sculpture “Porta/Porta” San Teodoro, Italy

2018

 Ausstellung im Kabinett Pit Kroke: Zeichen • Skulptur • Grafik • Schmuck. Kunsthandel Dr. Wilfred Karger Berlin

2019

 “Photographie concrete” PhotoSanitGermain – Galerie Gimpel & Müller Paris https://pitkroke.com/concrete-photography-1958-1960/

GROUP EXHIBITIONS 

1995
-
 Galerie L. Teutloff, Sculpture Park, Bielefeld
1997
 Willy Brandt Haus, Berlin, exhibition “Pictures of Germany”
 Galerie Pels-Leusden, “sculptures” Berlin/Kampen
1996
 Substation Berlin Kreuzberg, exhibition “Aggregate State” video sculpture Zippo
 State Chancellery in Brandenburg, Potsdam “graphic works”
1999
 Wilhelm Lehmbruck Museum, Duisburg – “Projects for Bunker Gallery” in Emscherpark
2000
 Wilhelm Lehmbruck Museum, Duisburg, “Global Art Rheinland 2000 – Cultural Spaces” sculpture since 1970
2009/10
 Wilhelm Lehmbruck Museum, Duisburg, “from Picasso to Warhol. Avant-garde sculpture jewellery “
 Herbert Gerisch Stiftung, Neumünster “seduction and Order” with Heike Weber,
2012/14
 Kings Elisabeth Bergen Klinik Park, Berlin “sculptures”
2013/14
 Kurhaus Ahrenshoop, “Berlin am Meer”, art trade Brusberg, sculpture 2TTRO
 Kunstverein Wilhelmshöhe, Ettlingen “Stahlkplastik in Germany yesterday and today”
2015
 Museum in the culture store, Würzburg “photograph and data image – traces of concrete photography”
2021
 “Photographie concrete” PhotoSanitGermain – Galerie Gimpel & Müller Paris

1936 births
2016 deaths
German sculptors
Artist authors